Solvent Black 3 is an azo dye. It is a non-fluorescent, relatively thermostable lysochrome (fat-soluble dye) diazo dye used for staining of neutral triglycerides and lipids on frozen sections and some lipoproteins on paraffin sections. It has the appearance of a dark brown to black powder with maximum absorption at 596–605 nm and melting point 120–124 °C. It stains blue-black.

Applications
Solvent Black 3 is used for a wide variety of commercial applications.

In the laboratory, Solvent Black 3 is used for Sudan staining. Similar dyes include Oil Red O, Sudan III, and Sudan IV. It can be used to stain some other materials than the other Sudan dyes, as it is not so specific to lipids. It is used is in fingerprint enhancement. It is useful for detecting fats that are contaminated with oil and grease. In differentiating haematological disorders, it will stain myeloblasts but not lymphoblasts.

It was introduced by Lison and Dagnelie in 1935.

Production and composition
Sudan Black is formed by coupling of diazotized 4-phenylazo-1-naphthylamine with 2,3-dihydro-2,2-dimethyl-1H-perimidine. Therefore, the main product expected was 2,3-dihydro-2,2dimethyl-6-[(4-phenylazo-1-naphthalenyl)-azo]-1H-perimidine. However the dye resulting from the above reaction product actually contains many, up to 42 colored and colorless by-products that can be fractionated. The two major products were blue in color confirmed by various chromatographic (TLC and column etc.) separation and spectroscopic (IR, NMR, Mass) identification were named SBB-I & SBB-II (Rf values of 0.49 and 0.19 (chloroform/benzene 1:1, SiO2) in thin Layer Chromatography). The above described product indeed turned out to be SSB-II which comprises up to 60% of the mixture, and the SBB-I was 2,3-dihydro-2,2-dimethyl-4-[(4-phenylazo-1-naphthalenyl)-azo]-1H-perimidine.

References

External links
 Stains File entry

Azo dyes
Staining dyes
Naphthalenes
Nitrogen heterocycles
Sudan dyes